St Joseph's English High School is a private Catholic primary and secondary school located in Gujranwala, Punjab, Pakistan. Established in 1954, the school is the first English medium school in Gujranwala.

History 
St Joseph's English High School was founded on the 1 April 1954, by Fr. Bene OFM (Cap.) then Parish Priest of Gujranwala, in the Roman Catholic Archdiocese of Lahore. Originally named as St Mary's School, it was started for the Christian students at Khokharki. Mr John Rehmat was the first teacher, with primary classes of about fifteen students.

In 1958 the school was shifted to premises close to Khokharki and the name was changed from St. Mary's to St. Joseph's School by Fr. Clarence OFM (Cap.). Later St Joseph's Urdu Medium Primary School was added. In 1972 all private schools in Pakistan were nationalized by the government.

Curriculum
The school syllabus prepares the pupil from nursery to the matriculation certificate examination of the Gujranwala board. The matriculation classes have only a science stream. All science subjects including mathematics are taught in English while social studies and islamiyat are taught in Urdu. The Urdu medium school has all subjects taught in Urdu.

References

Gujranwala
Catholic secondary schools in Pakistan
Catholic elementary and primary schools in Pakistan
Schools in Punjab, Pakistan
1954 establishments in Pakistan
Educational institutions established in 1954